The ISSA Grace Kennedy Boys and Girls Championships (better known as Champs) is an annual Jamaican high school track and field meet held by Jamaica's Inter-Secondary Schools Sports Association. The  five day event, held during the last week before Easter in Kingston, has been considered a proving ground for many Jamaican athletes.

History
The Championships began as a standardized sports day for six of Jamaica's oldest high schools, Potsdam (now Munro College), St. George's College, Jamaica College, the Wolmer's School, New College and Mandeville Middle Grade School. Originally known as the Inter-Secondary School Championship Sports, rules and staging of the event were managed by an Organizing Committee comprising the headmasters of the six boys’ schools and was first chaired by William Cowper, headmaster of Wolmer's. A cadre of volunteers consisting of coaches, sports masters and others served as timekeepers, starters, referees and other meet officials.

The first Boys’ Champs began at the test cricket ground Sabina Park on June 29, 1910, in Kingston, Jamaica.

Loosely modelled after the school athletic sports at British public schools such as Eton and Harrow, the event quickly gained popularity among the Jamaican public. Over six previous years, fans had attended a boys’ track meet in which athletes were given handicaps according to age, reputation and overall appearance – as in a horse race – but this format was discontinued in 1910 when new rules and a new trophy were introduced.

There is evidence of a Girls’ Athletics Championships as early as 1914 in Kingston, but after re-emerging under different organizations in the 1940s, 1957, then 1961, the girls’ event had an unbroken run since being managed by the Games Mistresses Association (founded 1963), a national organization of physical education teachers.

Only sixteen schools have ever won a boys’ or girls’ championship, with Kingston College (1962–1975) having the longest boys’ winning streak and Vere Technical winning the girls division the most times in a row (1979–1993). In its history, only Excelsior High School and St. Jago High have ever won both boys’ and girls’ divisions at Champs. The feat has never been accomplished in the same year.

St Hilda's Diocesan High School in St Ann was the first school to win the girls championship.

ISSA and GMA
In 1999, after years of deliberation between the ISSA and GMA, and precipitated by shrinking revenues particularly at Girls’ Champs, the GMA ceded control of the girls’ event to ISSA. The two meets are now staged together over five days, beginning with field events and ending with all relays.

The Games Mistresses Association (GMA) of Jamaica has been led by Presidents including Joyce Taylor, Barbara Jones and Joan Lloyd-Hudson. Lloyd-Hudson took over the Presidency from Barbara Jones and served for two years. She improved the operations of the championship and negotiated a sponsorship deal with MILO. The Presidents are selected by a national election, Jamaican physical education high school teachers gather in Kingston annually for the elections. Among the responsibilities of the GMA are management of girls' sports on a national level, including the physical education curriculum.

The GMA merged with ISSA in 1999 after several years of discussion with the principals of the nation's high schools. Some supporters of the continuation of a GMA-led girl's champs thought the move was purely a financial one. Others believed the ISSA group wanted to have full control of both boys and girls champs which would allow more effective planning of the championships.

The girls and boys championships are the biggest track and field event involving high school students anywhere in the world. These events are planned around high school students and often attract college coaches from around the world. Many of these students receive college scholarships (outside of the country) on the track during the meet.

After the 4-day championship, the students in their home schools, prepare to go the Penn Relays in the USA where they often dominate all the sprint events. Those schools who may have lost a particular event at the Girls or boys championship look forward to a second opportunity at the Penn relays.

Boys' Champions
A list of the winners of the Boys' Champs.

 1910: Wolmer’s Boys
 1911: Jamaica College
 1912: Jamaica College 
 1913: Jamaica College
 1914: St. George’s College
 1915: Wolmer’s Boys
 1916: Jamaica College
 1917: Wolmer’s Boys
 1918: Jamaica College
 1919: Jamaica College
 1920: Munro College
 1921: Jamaica College
 1922: Jamaica College
 1923: Jamaica College
 1924: Wolmer’s Boys
 1925: St. George’s College
 1926: Munro College
 1927: Wolmer’s Boys
 1928: Jamaica College
 1929: Wolmer’s Boys
 1930: Calabar High School
 1931: Calabar High
 1932: Calabar High
 1933: Calabar High
 1934: Munro College
 1935: Munro College
 1936: Calabar High
 1937: Kingston College
 1938: Wolmer’s Boys
 1939: Wolmer’s Boys
 1940: Jamaica College
 1941: Wolmer’s Boys
 1942: Kingston College
 1943: Munro College
 1944: No Competition
 1945: Munro College
 1946: Calabar High
 1947: Munro College
 1948: Munro College
 1949: Wolmer’s Boys
 1950: Kingston College
 1951: Kingston College
 1952: Jamaica College
 1953: Kingston College
 1954: Kingston College
 1955: Calabar High
 1956: Wolmer’s Boys
 1957: Kingston College
 1958: Calabar High
 1959: Jamaica College
 1960: Excelsior High
 1961: Calabar High
 1962: Kingston College
 1963: Kingston College
 1964: Kingston College
 1965: Kingston College
 1966: Kingston College
 1967: Kingston College
 1968: Kingston College
 1969: Kingston College
 1970: Kingston College
 1971: Kingston College
 1972: Kingston College
 1973: Kingston College
 1974: Kingston College
 1975: Kingston College
 1976: Calabar High
 1977: Calabar High
 1978: Calabar High
 1979: Kingston College
 1980: Kingston College
 1981: Calabar High
 1982: Clarendon College (Jamaica)
 1983: Kingston College
 1984: Clarendon College
 1985: Clarendon College
 1986: Calabar High
 1987: St. Jago High
 1988:Calabar High
 1989: Calabar High
 1990: Calabar High
 1991:Jamaica College
 1992: Jamaica College
 1993: St. Jago High
 1994: Jamaica College
 1995: Jamaica College
 1996: Calabar High
 1997: Calabar High
 1998: Jamaica College
 1999: Jamaica College
 2000: Jamaica College
 2001:Kingston College
 2002:Kingston College
 2003:Kingston College
 2004:Kingston College
 2005: Kingston College
 2006: Kingston College
 2007: Calabar High
 2008: Calabar High
 2009: Kingston College
 2010: Wolmer’s Boys
 2011: Jamaica College
 2012: Calabar High
 2013: Calabar High
 2014: Calabar High
 2015 Calabar High
 2016: Calabar High
 2017: Calabar High
 2018: Calabar High
 2019: Kingston College
 2020: Cancelled due to the global COVID-19 pandemic
 2021: Jamaica College
 2022: Kingston College

Girls' Champions
A list of the winners of Girls' Champs.

 1957: St. Hilda’s High
 1958-60: No Competition
 1961: Manchester High School, Jamaica
 1962: St. Andrew High School
 1963: Titchfield High School
 1964: Titchfield High
 1965: Manning's School
 1966: Manning's School
 1967: Vere Technical
 1968: Vere Technical
 1969: Manning's School
 1970: Excelsior
 1971: Excelsior
 1972: Excelsior
 1973: Excelsior High
 1974: Vere Technical
 1975: Vere Technical
 1976: St Mary High School, Jamaica
 1977: St Mary High
 1978: Queen’s School, Jamaica
 1979: Vere Technical
 1980: Vere Technical
 1981: Vere Technical
 1982: Vere Technical
 1983: Vere Technical
 1984: Vere Technical
 1985: Vere Technical
 1986: Vere Technical
 1987: Vere Technical
 1988: Vere Technical
 1990: Vere Technical
 1991: Vere Technical
 1992: Vere Technical
 1993: Vere Technical
 1994: Manchester High
 1995: Manchester High
 1996: St Jago High
 1997: St Jago High
 1998: St Jago High
 1999: St Jago High
 2000: Vere Technical
 2001: Vere Technical
 2002: Vere Technical
 2003: Holmwood Technical
 2004: Holmwood Technical
 2005: Holmwood Technical
 2006: Holmwood Technical
 2007: Holmwood Technical
 2008: Holmwood Technical
 2009: Holmwood Technical
 2010: Holmwood Technical
 2011: Holmwood Technical
 2012: Edwin Allen High
 2013: Holmwood Technical
 2014: Edwin Allen High
 2015: Edwin Allen High
 2016: Edwin Allen High
 2017: Edwin Allen High
 2018: Edwin Allen High
 2019: Edwin Allen High
 2020: Cancelled due to the global coronavirus pandemic
 2021: Edwin Allen High
 2022: Edwin Allen High

Champs Today
The merged Champs is now a five-day event, featuring thousands of Jamaican athletes competing in four age classes for girls and three for boys as follows:
Boys
Class 1	: under 19
Class 2	: under 16
Class 3	: under 14

Girls
Class 1	: under 19
Class 2	: under 17
Class 3	: under 15
Class 4	: under 13

Competitions takes place in 100 m, 200 m, 400 m, 800 m, 1500 m, 3000 m (girls only), 5000 m, 4 × 100 m, 4 × 400 and medley relays, hurdles – 110 m, 100 m, 70 m (girls only), high jump, long jump and triple jump, pole vault, discus throw, shot put, javelin throw and the heptathlon.

Numerous students who have competed at the Champs meeting have gone on to global success. Triple Olympic/World gold medalist and world record holder Usain Bolt first came to the fore in 2002, after failing to win any events in the Class 3 age group. Olympic champions Veronica Campbell-Brown, and Shelly-Ann Fraser suffered defeats in the lower age groups at the meet before finally winning for their school teams. Three-time 100 m world record-holder and World/Olympic gold medalist (4 × 100 m) Asafa Powell competed, but never became a household name at the high school level because he was disqualified in the Class 1 100m final. The 2016 Double Olympic Champion Elaine Thompson also competed, only ever finishing fourth in the 100 m at the Class 2 level. Other top performers at Champs who have gone on to excel on the world stage include Michael Frater, Bert Cameron, Melaine Walker, Winthrop Graham, Beverly McDonald, Maurice Wignall, Juliet Cuthbert, Sandie Richards and Raymond Stewart.

Although the high school competition developed world-class talent such as Olympic stars Arthur Wint and Herb McKenley, Una Morris and Vilma Charlton, then Lennox Miller, Donald Quarrie and Merlene Ottey, Champs was virtually unknown to mainstream international media until the emergence of a disproportionate number of world-class sprinters from Jamaica in the Olympic Games and IAAF World Championships in Athletics. American college coaches in particular were very aware of the richness of the competitor pool, since they annually traveled to Kingston to scout for junior college and NCAA-level talent. Several top performers at Champs such as British high jumper Germaine Mason are former Jamaican high school stars. Jamaican-born American sprinter Sanya Richards competed at the meet for Immaculate Conception High School before migrating to the US in 1997.

References

National championships in Jamaica
Recurring sporting events established in 1910
High school sports
Youth athletics